Gobipalpa is a genus of moths in the family Gelechiidae. It contains the species Gobipalpa inexpectata. It is found in Mongolia.

References

Gnorimoschemini